James Matthew Dombrowski (born October 19, 1963) is a former American college and professional football player who was a guard and offensive tackle in the National Football League (NFL) for eleven seasons.  Dombrowski played college football for the University of Virginia, and earned All-American honors.  A first-round pick in the 1986 NFL Draft, he played his entire 11-year pro career for the NFL's New Orleans Saints.  He was elected to the College Football Hall of Fame in 2008 and the Virginia Sports Hall of Fame in 2010.

Early years 

Dombrowski was born in Williamsville, New York.  He graduated from Williamsville South High School, and played for the Williamsville South Billies high school football team.

College career 

Dombrowski accepted an athletic scholarship to attend the University of Virginia, where he played for coach George Welsh's Virginia Cavaliers football team from 1982 to 1985.  He won numerous accolades as one of the finest student-athletes in the history of UVa athletics, including being recognized as a unanimous first-team All-American as a senior in 1985.  He was also a two-time first-team All-Atlantic Coast Conference (ACC) selection in 1984 and 1985, the recipient of the ACC's Jacobs Blocking Trophy in 1984 and 1985 as the conference's best offensive lineman, and a first-team Academic All-Conference honoree in 1985.  After graduation, he was later honored as a recipient of the NCAA's Today's Top Six Award for his combined athletic ability, academic achievement, leadership characteristics and campus involvement.  Dombrowski's No. 73 jersey has been retired by the university.

Professional career 

He ultimately played his entire professional career with the Saints and was named to the franchise's 30th and 35th anniversary teams. During his 11 NFL seasons, he played in 151 regular season games and started 137 of them.

Life after football 
Dombrowski earned his master's degree in education in 1991. He resides in Mandeville, Louisiana and works as a certified financial planner for Benjamin F. Edwards. He was inducted into the College Football Hall of Fame in 2008, and the Greater Buffalo Sports Hall of Fame in 2009. In 2013, he was elected into the National Polish-American Sports Hall of Fame.

References 

1963 births
Living people
All-American college football players
American football offensive linemen
College Football Hall of Fame inductees
New Orleans Saints players
People from Williamsville, New York
Virginia Cavaliers football players
People from Mandeville, Louisiana
Ed Block Courage Award recipients